POTF may refer to:

 Phil of the Future, an American comedy children's television series
 Poets of the Fall, an independent rock band from Finland
 Destroy All Humans! Path of the Furon, the fourth Destroy All Humans! game